Ludhiana Elevated road is an under-construction expressway corridor in Ludhiana city of Punjab, India. The project is being implemented by the National Highways Authority of India (NHAI) at an estimated cost of ₹1,000 crore.

A four-lane elevated highway in the city is nearing completion. This 12.95-km-long stretch between the busy Samrala chowk and Ludhiana municipal limits on the National Highway-95, costing ₹756.27 crore, is targeted to be completed by August next year, the district administration has claimed.

The development holds significance as the stretch, which is presently narrow, has assumed the distinction of a killer highway, snuffing out precious lives in major and minor accidents on a daily basis, due to high volume of vehicular traffic.

Project report:

Cost ₹756.27 crore

Length 12.951 km

Start date Oct 10, 2017

Proposed August 31, 2022 completion date

Deputy Commissioner Varinder Kumar Sharma has stated that the NH-95 section passing through the city is being constructed on the EPC (Engineering, Procurement and Construction) mode under the National Highways Development Project (NHDP) Phase IV.

The elevated highway, connecting the Samrala chowk to the Ludhiana municipal limits till the Ferozepur road on the NH-5 in the city, will be six-lane from Bharat Nagar to municipal limits with two loops — one towards the railway station and another towards the ISBT.

The project entails six ramps — three each at exit and entry points — and a flyover at the Cheema chowk with 320-metre length, which has already been completed and opened for traffic by the then NHAI Chairman, Sukhbir Singh Sandhu, here in February.

The under-construction elevated highway will provide uninterrupted flow of traffic to several government offices, including Mini Secretariat, Commissioner of Police office, head post office and major business establishments.

Even as the construction work on the project had commenced in October 2017, it could not be accelerated due to existing trees, electricity supply lines of 11, 66, and 220-KV and presence of sewer and water supply lines at several locations.

After clearance of all hurdles coming in the way, the work on the project has finally picked up pace and is expected to be completed within the stipulated timeframe.

While the Cheema chowk flyover was completed and opened to traffic five months ago, work from 9.5-km to 12.95-km, including two ramps on either side for exit and entry, will be completed by October, 2021.

The work on the remaining portion of the project from Bharat Nagar to the canal will be completed by August, 2022, added Sharma.

References

Expressways in Punjab, India
Transport in Ludhiana

External links